Martins Creek is a small country town located between Dungog and Maitland in the Hunter Region of Australia.

The town is centered on Cory Street, which snakes its way through the centre of the town.

Martins Creek includes a NSW Government Primary School, church, tennis court and club house, public hall, rock quarry and the "skipline" Park, as well as the Martins Creek Rural Fire Brigade station. The Martins Creek railway station lies on the North Coast railway line and has five daily NSW TrainLink services south-east to Newcastle and north to Dungog.

Gostwyck Butter Factory 
The factory was located on 112 Dungog Road. The site was owned by Raymond Co-Operative Dairy Company. Opened on 18 June 1908. In 1915 Peters American Delicacy Company purchased the butter factory. In 1926 Peters sold the factory back to Raymond Co-Operative Dairy Company. In 1927 the factory closed.

References

Towns in the Hunter Region
Suburbs of Dungog Shire